is a Japanese luger. She competed in the women's singles event at the 1988 Winter Olympics.

References

External links
 

1971 births
Living people
Japanese female lugers
Olympic lugers of Japan
Lugers at the 1988 Winter Olympics
Sportspeople from Hokkaido